The women's 200 metre breaststroke competition at the 2022 Mediterranean Games was held on 5 July 2022 at the Aquatic Center of the Olympic Complex in Bir El Djir.

Records
Prior to this competition, the existing world and Mediterranean Games records were as follows:

Results

Heats
The heats were started at 11:01.

Final 
The final was held at 18:35.

References

Women's 200 metre breaststroke
2022 in women's swimming